The S.P.A. 6A was an Italian aero engine of the World War I era.  It was a water-cooled inline six-cylinder engine that produced 220 horsepower (164 kW).

Applications
Ansaldo A.1 Balilla
Ansaldo SVA
Bartel BM.5
Breda A.2
Breda A.3
Breda A.9 and A.9bis
CANT 7ter
Caproni Ca.61a
Caproni Ca.66
Gabardini G.9
SIAI S.50

Specifications

See also

References

Notes

Bibliography

 Jane's Fighting Aircraft of World War I. London. Studio Editions Ltd, 1993. 

1910s aircraft piston engines
Straight-six engines